Mind Blowing Breakthroughs is an Argentinian-South Korean animated series.

Plot
Baron Munchausen and his assistants, Betty and Merdock, try to impress his audiences with the scientists of the world. In season 3, the Baron and his friends need to stop Leipzig and his genie from causing chaos around the world.

Episodes

Season 1

Season 2

Season 3

References

Argentine children's animated comedy television series
South Korean animated television series